Astylus is a genus of beetles in the family Melyridae. More than 110 species have been described in Astylus. They are found in Central and South America.

Species

 Astylus antis
 Astylus atromaculatus
 Astylus aulicus
 Astylus bonplandi
 Astylus bourgeoisi
 Astylus cyanerythrus
 Astylus forcipatus
 Astylus gayi
 Astylus lebasi
 Astylus octopustulatus
 Astylus quadrilineatus
 Astylus rubripennis
 Astylus sexmaculatus
 Astylus trifasciatus
 Astylus variegatus
 Astylus vittaticollis
 Astylus vittatus

References

Further reading

 

Melyridae
Cleroidea genera